Donald Van Durme (born 23 August 1967) is a retired Belgian football defender.

Honours

Club 
Anderlecht

 Belgian Cup: 1987–88, 1988–89
 European Cup Winners' Cup: 1989-90 (runners-up)
 Bruges Matins: 1988

References

1967 births
Living people
Belgian footballers
R.S.C. Anderlecht players
K.V. Kortrijk players
R.E. Mouscron players
Association football defenders
Belgian Pro League players